Perovskaya may refer to:
 2422 Perovskaya, a celestial object
 Sophia Perovskaya, a Russian revolutionary
 Olga Perovskaya